Kerstin Frank (born 23 October 1988) is an Austrian former competitive figure skater. She is a six-time national champion and represented Austria at the 2014 Winter Olympics. She has won eleven international medals and reached the free skate at nine ISU Championships.

Personal life
Kerstin Frank was born on 23 October 1988 in Vienna, Austria. She studied biology at the University of Vienna and serves in a work and sports program in the Austrian army.

Career

Frank began competing on the junior international level in 2004 and made her senior international debut in spring 2006; she would appear on both levels that year and 2007. Her best result at an ISU Junior Grand Prix event was seventh at the 2006 JGP in Courchevel, France. She was selected to represent Austria at the 2007 World Junior Championships in Oberstdorf and finished 23rd.

In the 2008–09 season, Frank won the silver medal at the Austrian Championships and was assigned to her first senior ISU Championships. Reaching the free skate at both events, she placed 20th at the 2009 European Championships in Helsinki and 23rd at the 2009 World Championships in Los Angeles.

Frank achieved her best European result at the 2013 European Championships in Zagreb, where she finished 12th. At the 2013 Nebelhorn Trophy, she qualified a ladies' entry for her country at the 2014 Winter Olympics. She placed 26th in Sochi.

Programs

Competitive highlights 
GP: Grand Prix; CS: Challenger Series; JGP: Junior Grand Prix

References

External links

 
 Kerstin Frank at Tracings.net
 Kerstin Frank at Facebook.com

Austrian female single skaters
1988 births
Living people
Figure skaters from Vienna
Figure skaters at the 2014 Winter Olympics
Olympic figure skaters of Austria
Competitors at the 2015 Winter Universiade
Competitors at the 2011 Winter Universiade